Alexander Wiley (May 26, 1884 – October 26, 1967) was an American politician who served four terms in the United States Senate for the state of Wisconsin from 1939 to 1963. When he left the Senate, he was its most senior Republican member.

Biography

Wiley was born in Chippewa Falls, Wisconsin. He received his undergraduate education at Augsburg College in Minnesota and the University of Michigan in Ann Arbor, Michigan. He received his law degree from the University of Wisconsin–Madison in 1907 and was also admitted to the bar the same year. He served as the Chippewa County district attorney from 1909 to 1915.

Wiley was the Republican candidate for governor of Wisconsin in 1936, but his bid failed. Philip La Follette and the new Wisconsin Progressive Party, which split from the Republicans in 1934, won the election. In 1938, Wiley was elected to the U.S. Senate, first defeating Tax Court judge Stephen J. McMahon to win the Republican nomination, and then defeating incumbent F. Ryan Duffy to win the seat. In 1944, he was challenged by United States Marine Corps Captain Joseph R. McCarthy in the Republican primary. He defeated McCarthy and won the general election. Wiley, then an isolationist in foreign policy, and Governor Walter S. Goodland supported Republican presidential nominee Thomas E. Dewey in the 1944 race over incumbent Franklin D. Roosevelt, and Dewey won Wisconsin's electoral votes but fell short nationally.

Wiley was re-elected two more times in 1950 and 1956. In 1956, he was challenged by U.S. Representative Glenn Robert Davis in the Republican primary, but again prevailed. Wiley voted in favor of the Civil Rights Acts of 1957 and 1960, as well as the 24th Amendment to the U.S. Constitution. In 1962, Wiley lost his bid for a fifth term to Governor Gaylord Nelson, a liberal Democrat. Wiley was the last Republican to serve as U.S. Senator from Wisconsin until the election of former 9th district congressman Bob Kasten in 1980.

Wiley had a distinguished Senate career that included the chairmanship of both the Foreign Relations and Judiciary committees.

Wiley died in Germantown, Pennsylvania at age 83. He was interred at Forest Hill Cemetery in Chippewa Falls. During his lifetime he was a member of the Freemasons, the Knights Templar, the Elks Club, the Kiwanis, the Knights of Pythias, the Moose International, the Sons of Norway, and Sigma Phi Epsilon.

Notes

External links

1884 births
1967 deaths
District attorneys in Wisconsin
Augsburg University alumni
University of Michigan alumni
University of Wisconsin Law School alumni
Republican Party United States senators from Wisconsin
Wisconsin Republicans
Politicians from Chippewa Falls, Wisconsin
20th-century American politicians
Chairmen of the Senate Committee on Foreign Relations